Khuwyt  (c. 1960 B.C.) was an ancient Egyptian musician who is represented in a decorative painting on the tomb of Antefoker, an Egyptian political official during the Twelfth Dynasty. She and a male musician, identified as the singer Didumin, are depicted side by side, playing harps to entertain Antefoker. She is identified on the north wall of the tomb as "chantress, Khuwyt, daughter of Maket." Their songs are about Hathor, the golden goddess, and about the vizier himself, wishing him life and health.

References

20th-century BC Egyptian people
20th-century BC women
Egyptian women musicians